Tikhon of Moscow (– ), born Vasily Ivanovich Bellavin, was a bishop of the Russian Orthodox Church (ROC). On 5 November 1917 (OS) he was selected the 11th Patriarch of Moscow and All Russia, after a period of about 200 years of the Synodal rule in the ROC. He was canonised as a confessor by the ROC in 1989.

Early life
From 1878 to 1884, Bellavin studied at the Pskov Theological Seminary.  In 1888, at the age of 23, he graduated from the Saint Petersburg Theological Academy as a layman. He then returned to the Pskov Seminary and became an instructor of Moral and Dogmatic Theology.  In 1891, at the age of 26, he took monastic vows and was given the name Tikhon in honor of St. Tikhon of Zadonsk.  Tikhon was consecrated Bishop of Lublin on 19 October 1897.

Bishop in the United States
On 14 September 1898, he was appointed Bishop of the Aleutian Islands and Alaska. He went to the United States, and eventually became a naturalized American citizen. The peripatetic bishop visited emerging Orthodox emigrant communities in various American cities, including New York City, Chicago and the coal and steel-making cities in Pennsylvania and Ohio. 

As head of the ROC diocese in North America, in 1900 he reorganized the diocese and changed its name from the "Of the Aleutian Islands and Alaska" to "Diocese of the Aleutian Islands and North America". He had two auxiliary bishops in the United States: Bishop Innocent (Pustynsky) in Alaska, and St. Raphael (Hawaweeny) in Brooklyn. On 22 May 1901, he blessed the cornerstone for St. Nicholas Cathedral in New York City (fundraising for which had begun in 1894 and to which Tsar Nicholas II contributed $5,000 in 1900) in a great ceremony attended by New York Mayor Seth Low, Russian diplomats and sailors, and enthusiastic worshippers. He celebrated the first liturgy in the new building's basement on July 20, 1902, and in the main hall on November 10, 1902. Tikhon was also involved in building other churches in North America, and establishing a dialog with Greek Orthodox churches in America. On 9 November 1902, he consecrated the church of St. Nicholas in Brooklyn for Syrian Antiochian Orthodox immigrants.

While in the United States, Tikhon became aware of the country's tradition of religious diversity, as well as the growing ecumenical and Pan-Slav movements, and the needs of a wide variety of eastern and southern European immigrants. Before his arrival, in 1890, a delegation of Carpatho-Rusyns also had approached the Russian consul in San Francisco and requested a bishop, since the Latin Catholic archbishop of Minnesota, John Ireland was attempting to force their assimilation, although Byzantine Rite Catholics had previously been accorded certain dispensations from the Roman Rite practices of the Latin Church. Their Byzantine (Ruthenian) Catholic priest, Alexis Toth, was formally accepted into the Russian Orthodox Church in 1892. In 1900, Tikhon attended the consecration of Reginald Heber Weller as coadjutor bishop for the Episcopal Diocese of Fond du Lac, though he was not one of the consecrating bishops (all Episcopalians). More Byzantine Catholics joined the Eastern Orthodox fold, especially priests after 1907, when Pope Pius X published Ea Semper, restricting their previously recognized right to ordain married men.

In 1905, the title of Archbishop was bestowed on him, and he moved his formal residence and diocesan office from San Francisco to New York. In June 1905, the new archbishop gave his blessing for the establishment of a monastery in Pennsylvania, St. Tikhon's Monastery which in the 1930s supported the founding of Saint Tikhon's Orthodox Theological Seminary. On  The Holy Trinity Russian (Greek) Orthodox church was consecrated in Winnipeg, Manitoba, Canada, on the corner of McKenzie Street and Manitoba Avenue by the new Archbishop Tikhon, Head of the Russian Orthodox Mission in North America and soon to become Patriarch of Moscow and All Russia. Ukrainian teachers studying at the Ruthenian Training School sang at the consecration ceremony.

Return to Russia and restoration of the Patriarchate
In 1907, Tikhon returned to Russia, having been appointed to the See of Yaroslavl. On 22 December 1913, he was transferred to the diocese of Vilno in Lithuania.

However, the First World War and the Russian Revolution created turmoil in his native land. On 21 June 1917, the Diocesan Congress of clergy and laity elected Tikhon the ruling bishop of Moscow.  On 14 August 1917 (OS), Tikhon was raised to the dignity of Metropolitan of Moscow. On the next day, the Local Council of the ROC, the first such convention since the late 17th century, opened in Moscow. The council's major decision that passed on 28 October 1917, days after the Bolsheviks seized power in Petrograd, was to restore the Patriarchy in the ROC. On 5 November 1917, after his election by vote as one of the three candidates for the reinstated Moscow Patriarchate, Metropolitan Vladimir of Kiev announced that Metropolitan Tikhon had been selected for the position after a drawing of lots as the new Patriarch of Moscow and All Russia.

Patriarchate
During the Russian Civil War the patriarch, like the entire Russian Church, was widely considered anti-Bolshevik and many bishops were exiled, imprisoned or even executed by the new regime.  Tikhon openly condemned the killings of the tsar's family in 1918, and protested against violent attacks by the Bolsheviks on the church. In 1920, he granted autonomy to what became the Orthodox Church in America and other dioceses of the Church of Russia that were cut off from the governance of the highest church authority (i.e. the patriarch), until such time as normal relations with the highest church authority could be resumed.

In November 1921, many of the Russian bishops, who had fled Russia in 1919–1920, had gathered in Sremski Karlovci, Serbia, and adopted a number of anti-Bolshevik statements; in May the following year Tikhon and his Synod formally dissolved the exile group, which nevertheless continued to exist as a separate Russian ecclesiastical entity, viewed as schismatic by the Moscow Patriarchate until 2007.

In 1922 Russia was afflicted with mass famine. The Communist government used the situation to confiscate ecclesiastical property and to accuse the patriarch of being a saboteur. From April 1922 until June 1923 he resided under house arrest in Donskoy Monastery. His public protest against nationalization of Church property was reframed as a criminal act. This caused international resonance and several countries sent formal protest notes to the Soviet government.

Under pressure from the authorities, Tikhon issued several messages to the believers in which he stated in part that he was "no longer an enemy to the Soviet power". Textual analysis of these messages shows considerable similarity with a number of documents exchanged in the Politburo on the "Tikhon's Affair".  Despite his declaration of loyalty, he continued to enjoy the trust of the Orthodox community in Russia. In 1923 Tikhon was "deposed" by a Soviet-sponsored council of the so-called Living Church, which decreed that he was "henceforth a simple citizen—Vasily Bellavin." This deposition has never been recognized as an act of the Russian Orthodox Church, and is therefore considered invalid by both the Russian Orthodox Church and the Russian Federation.

Death
In 1924 the patriarch fell ill and was hospitalized.  On 5 April 1925, he served his last Divine Liturgy, and died two days later, 25 March (OS)/7 April, the Feast of the Annunciation.  He was buried on 12 April in the winter church of Donskoy Monastery in Moscow. From the time of his death, he was widely considered a martyr or confessor for the faith.

Canonization

He was later glorified by the Moscow Patriarchate during the Bishop's Council of 9–11 October 1989. This later canonization process is generally considered an example of the thaw in church–Soviet relations during the Glasnost era. The American Episcopal Church along with the Anglican Church in North America remember Tikhon with a feast day on their liturgical calendars on the anniversary of his death, April 7.

St Tikhon's relics were believed lost, but on 19 February 1992 his coffin was found in a hidden crypt in the Donskoy Monastery and on 22 February, the coffin was opened and his relics were discovered to be almost entirely incorrupt.

See also 
 Anti-religious campaign during the Russian Civil War
 Persecution of Christians in the Soviet Union
 Religion in the Soviet Union
 USSR anti-religious campaign (1921–1928)
 List of American Eastern Orthodox saints

Notes

References

External links
 Biography of St. Tikhon by the Orthodox Church in America
 Glorification of St Tikhon, the Apostle to America
 Orthodox Icon of St. Tikhon with scenes from his life
 Patriarch Tikhon's Ordeal, Moscow's Cathedral of Christ the Savior, 244–266
 Fall of Tikon article from Time Magazine, 12 May 1923. Broken link.  There is no such article for May 1923.
 Saint Patriarch Tikhon – His Missionary Legacy to Orthodox America article from the periodical Orthodox America.
 On the Triumph of Orthodoxy a homily by Tikhon.
 Hieromartyr Tikhon, Patriarch of Moscow and All Russia Detailed biography.
 

1865 births
1925 deaths
Metropolitans and Patriarchs of Moscow
American saints of the Eastern Orthodox Church
Russian saints of the Eastern Orthodox Church
Primates of the Orthodox Church in America
Victims of anti-religious campaign in the Soviet Union
Eastern Orthodox missionaries
20th-century Eastern Orthodox martyrs
20th-century Christian saints
Anglican saints
Russian bishops